Ralph Morgenstern (born as Ralph Morgenstern-Nolting on 3 October 1956) is a German actor and TV host.

Morgenstern was born in Mülheim an der Ruhr. He works in theatre, film, and on German TV. Morgenstern has one daughter and has lived together with his partner Oliver since 2005.

Actor in theatre 

 1984-1986: Geierwally (Filmdose, Köln, Regie: Walter Bockmayer)
 1989-1990: Sissi - Beuteljahre einer Kaiserin (Filmdose, Köln, Regie: Walter Bockmayer)
 1991-1998: Festes Ensemble am Kölner Schauspielhaus
 1995 - Tankstelle der Verdammten (Kölner Schauspielhaus)
 1998 - Mephisto (Kölner Schauspielhaus)
 1998 - Faust (Kölner Schauspielhaus)
 2003 - Die Banditen (Oper Köln)
 2006-2007 - Kiss me Kate (Musikalische Komödie der Oper Leipzig)

Actor in films 
1984: Im Himmel ist die Hölle los (directed by Helmer von Lützelburg), as Mr. Raffo
1988:  (directed by Walter Bockmayer), as Aunt Luckard
1994: Die Wache: Vollmond (TV episode, directed by Bob Blagden), as Cross-dresser
1995: Ein Mann für gewisse Stunden (TV film)
1997: Das erste Semester (directed by Uwe Boll), as Restaurantleiter
1999: Gisbert (TV series, directed by Jojo Wolff or Hape Kerkeling), as Mr Faulhaber
2000: Schöne Aussichten (TV miniseries, directed by Rüdiger Nüchtern), as Fred Holmann
2000: I Love You, Baby (directed by Nick Lyon), as Sickenberger
2000: Die Anrheiner: Der beste Ort der Welt (TV episode), as Florian Finkel
2001: Ausziehn! (directed by Peter Morlock), as Lex Montgomery
Voice Actor
2004:  (directed by Michael Schaack), as Linda
2006:  (directed by Michael Schaack)

TV Host 

 1992 - Filmdosenshow (RTL, together with Hella von Sinnen)
 1993 - XOV bei VOX
 1994 - Klatschmohn (WDR)
 1995-2002 - Kaffeeklatsch (ZDF)
 2001-2007 - Blond am Freitag (host; Comedy-Wochenrückblick des ZDF)
 2005-2007 - ZDF-Fernsehgarten

External links 
 Website of Ralph Morgenstern
 Ralph Morgenstern in Deutschen Nationalbibliothek
 

1956 births
Living people
People from Mülheim
German male stage actors
German LGBT rights activists
German LGBT broadcasters
German television presenters
German television talk show hosts
German male film actors
ZDF people